is a private junior college in Ichinoseki, Iwate, Japan, chartered in 1953. The predecessor of the school was founded in 1899.

External links
 Official website 

Japanese junior colleges
Educational institutions established in 1899
Private universities and colleges in Japan
Universities and colleges in Iwate Prefecture
1899 establishments in Japan
Ichinoseki, Iwate